Ervin Bauer (19 October 1890, Lőcse, Hungary – 11 January 1938 Leningrad, Soviet Union) was a Hungarian biologist.

Short Biography 
In 1935, Ervin Bauer published a monograph Theoretical biology, in which he described the general thermodynamic features of living systems. His writings became particularly influential for the development of theoretical biology in Russia and several other countries.

In 1925 he moved from Hungary to Russia and from 1933 lived in Leningrad.

His first wife was a writer Margit Kaffka (who died in 1918), and his second wife was a mathematician Stefánia Szilárd.

Bauer and his wife Stefánia were arrested by NKVD on 4 August 1937, and both were shot on 11 January 1938.

He was the younger brother of Béla Balázs.

Research 
Ervin Bauer formulated the principle of stable non-equilibrium state which he considered as the basic characteristics of living matter. According to Bauer, living systems function in the expense of non-equilibrium, and the external energy is used not directly to perform work but to support the stable non-equilibrium state. Bauer's principle is incorporated into non-linear thermodynamics of irreversible processes. Living systems in this framework cannot support their organization only due to the influx of external energy, i.e. the ordering internal factor is involved. The activity of living system is fully determined by the internal pattern of its non-equilibrium state and any work performed by the biological system appears as the work of its structural forces. The process of evolution, according to Bauer, corresponds to the increase in external work, which aims to exploit additional resources to maintain living state of evolving biosystems.

References 

1890 births
1938 deaths
People from Levoča
Austro-Hungarian Jews
Jewish Hungarian scientists
Hungarian biologists
Jewish biologists
Theoretical biologists
Hungarian expatriates in Russia
Hungarian emigrants to the Soviet Union
Great Purge victims from Hungary
Jews executed by the Soviet Union
Executed Hungarian people
20th-century biologists